Fotherby is a surname. Notable people with the surname include:

Charles Fotherby ( 1549–1619), English clergyman
Martin Fotherby ( 1560–1620), English clergyman
Robert Fotherby (died 1646), English explorer and whaler